Ratboy is a 1986 American film.

Ratboy or Rat Boy may refer to:

 Jason "Ratboy" Collins (born 1974), American surfer
 Rat Boy (born 1996), a British Musician from Chelmsford, England
 Rat Boy, nickname of Yoshinari Ogawa (born 1966), Japanese professional wrestler
 Rat Boy, a character in Viz comics
 Ratboy or Anthony Kennedy (20th century), a juvenile delinquent who was a resident of Byker Wall in Newcastle upon Tyne, England

See also
Ratboys, an American indie band
Ratby, a village in Leicestershire, England